The 2021 WTBA World Tenpin Bowling Championships was the 29th edition of the championships and held in Dubai, UAE, in November 2021.

Format 
All doubles, trios and team competition at the World Championships featured variations of the Baker format from start to finish. Each event at the 2021 Super World Championships included 10 qualifying games, all at the Dubai International Bowling Centre, before a cut was made to the top 32 for singles and doubles and the top 16 for trios and the team events.

The advancing bowlers or teams were divided into four equal groups for round-robin match play within that group. Points were awarded for each win in match play, and the top two in each group, based on points, advanced to the single-elimination bracket-style quarterfinals.

Quarterfinal winners advanced to the semifinals and got to experience the custom venue at Expo 2020 Dubai.

Medal summary

Medal table

References 

World Tenpin Bowling Championships
2021 in bowling
2021 in Emirati sport
International sports competitions hosted by the United Arab Emirates
WTBA World Tenpin